Long i ( or [littera] i longa), written , is a variant of the letter i found in ancient and early medieval forms of the Latin script.

History

In inscriptions dating to the early Roman Empire, it is used frequently but inconsistently to transcribe the long vowel . In Gordon's 1957 study of inscriptions, it represented this vowel approximately 4% of the time in the 1st century CE, then 22.6% in the 2nd century, 11% in the 3rd, and not at all from the 4th century onward, reflecting a loss of phonemic vowel length by this time (one of the phonological changes from Classical Latin to Proto-Romance). In this role it is equivalent to the (also inconsistently-used) apex, which can appear on any long vowel:  . An example would be , which is generally spelled  today, using macrons rather than apices to indicate long vowels. On rare occasions, an apex could combine with long i to form , e.g. .

Later on in the late Empire and afterwards, in some forms of New Roman cursive, as well as pre-Carolingian scripts of the Early Middle Ages such as Visigothic or Merovingian, it came to stand for the vowel  in word-initial position. For example, which would be  in modern spelling.

In Unicode

Examples

References

See also
 Apex (diacritic)

Latin-script letters
Epigraphic letter variants